Koutsoufliani  may refer to a number of places in Greece:

 Koutsoufliani, Larissa, a village in Elassona
 Koutsoufliani, Phthiotis, a village in Makrakomi
 Koutsoufliani, Trikala, a village in Kalabaka